Bradina atralis is a moth in the family Crambidae. It was described by Pagenstecher in 1907. It is found on the Comoros, where it has been recorded from Grande Comore and Mohéli.

References

Moths described in 1907
Bradina